Ratchadaphon Wihantamma known as Sawsing Sor Sopit (สาวสิงห์ ส.โสพิศ) is a Thai Muay Thai fighter.. She is a former WMC, World Muay Thai Organization women's featherweight world champion. Wihantamma also gained several medals in IFMA World Muaythai Championships, World Combat Games, Asian Indoor and Martial Arts Games and Asian Beach Games.

Muay Thai career

World Professional Muaythai Federation 
On August 25, 2015, she challenged Ashley Nichols for the W.P.M.F Interm World Featherweight title and lost by decision.

International Federation of Muaythai Associations 
In 2016, Wihantamma won a bronze medal at the IFMA World Muay Thai Championships in Jönköping. In the same year, she also won a gold medal at the World Combat Games in Saint Petersburg. In 2013, She won a gold medal at the Asian Beach Games in Da Nang. In 2013 and 2017, Wihantamma won two gold medals at the Asian Indoor and Martial Games in Bangkok and Ashgabat.

World Muay Thai Council 
In January 2017, she challenged Candice Mitchell and won the WMC World Featherweight title by decision.

Championships and awards 
Amateur
  2017 Asian Indoor and Martial Arts Games -60 kg
  2016 IFMA World Muay Thai Championship -57 kg
  2017 IFMA World Muay Thai Championship -57 kg
  2016 Asian Beach Games -57 kg
  2013 World Combat Games -54 kg
  2013 Asian Indoor and Martial Arts Games -54 kg

Professional
World Muay Thai Council
 2010 WMC World 115 lbs Champion
 2017 WMC World 135 lbs Champion
World Professional Muaythai Federation
 2012 WPMF World Featherweight Champion (one defense)
 2013 WPMF World Featherweight Champion
Onesongchai
 2012 S-1 World 126 lbs Champion
Muay Thai Super Champ
 2020 Muay Thai Super Champ Tournament Winner

Muaythai record 

|-  style="background:#c5d2ea;"
| 2021-12-25 || Draw||align=left|Barbara Aguiar|| Muay Hardcore || Bangkok, Thailand || Decision  || 3 || 3:00

|-  style="background:#fbb;"
| 2021-11-20 || Loss||align=left|Barbara Aguiar|| Muay Hardcore || Bangkok, Thailand || Decision  || 3 || 3:00

|-  style="background:#cfc;"
| 2021-10-09 || Win ||align=left|Negin Shahinfar || Muay Hardcore || Phuket, Thailand || TKO || 1 ||

|-  style="background:#cfc;"
| 2021-04-04 || Win ||align=left|Barbara Aguiar|| Super Champ Muay Thai || Phuket, Thailand || Decision (Unanimous) || 3 || 3:00

|-  style="background:#cfc;"
| 2021-03-06 || Win ||align=left|Dilshoda Umarova|| Muay Hardcore || Bangkok, Thailand || Decision (Unanimous) || 3 || 3:00

|-  style="background:#cfc;"
| 2020-12-12 || Win ||align=left|Kristin Carlos|| Muay Hardcore || Bangkok, Thailand || Decision (Unanimous) || 3 || 3:00

|-  style="background:#fbb;"
| 2020-10-23 || Loss ||align=left|Smilla Sundell || Super Champ Muay Thai || Bangkok,Thailand || Decision || 3 || 3:00

|-  style="background:#cfc;"
| 2020-08-08 || Win ||align=left|Erin Kowal|| Muay Hardcore || Bangkok, Thailand || Decision (Unanimous) || 3 || 3:00

|-  style="background:#cfc;"
| 2020-02-23 || Win ||align=left|Ruslana Vyniavska || Super Champ Muay Thai, Final || Bangkok, Thailand || Decision  || 3 || 3:00 
|-
! style=background:white colspan=9 |

|-  style="background:#cfc;"
| 2020-02-23 || Win ||align=left|Malena Garcia || Super Champ Muay Thai, Semi Final || Bangkok, Thailand || Decision  || 3 || 3:00

|-  style="background:#c5d2ea;"
| 2020-01-19 || Draw||align=left|Ruslana Vyniavska || Super Champ Muay Thai || Bangkok, Thailand || Decision  || 3 || 3:00

|-  style="background:#cfc;"
| 2019-12-12 ||Win ||align=left| Souris Manfredi || Muay Hardcore || Bangkok, Thailand || Decision  || 3 || 3:00

|-  style="background:#cfc;"
| 2019-11-10|| Win||align=left| Marina Bernardes || Super Champ Muay Thai || Bangkok, Thailand || Decision  || 3 || 3:00

|-  style="background:#cfc;"
| 2019-10-19 ||Win ||align=left|Brooke Farrell || Muay Hardcore || Bangkok, Thailand || Decision  || 3 || 3:00

|-  style="background:#c5d2ea;"
| 2019-07-07 || Draw ||align=left|Brooke Farrell || Super Champ Muay Thai || Bangkok, Thailand || Decision  || 3 || 3:00

|-  style="background:#cfc;"
| 2019-03-16 || Win||align=left| ||  || Pattaya, Thailand || KO ||1 ||

|-  style="background:#cfc;"
| 2019-02-05 || Win ||align=left|Maisha Katz ||Thailand Sports Authority Event || Bangkok, Thailand || Decision  || 5 || 3:00 
|-
! style=background:white colspan=9 |

|-  style="background:#cfc;"
| 2018-02-06 || Win ||align=left|Natalie Hochimingym|| Muay Thai Day 6 || Bangkok, Thailand || Decision  || 5 || 2:00

|-  style="background:#cfc;"
| 2017-09-08 || Win ||align=left|Laura TigerMuayThai || Samui Fight || Ko Samui, Thailand || Decision  || 3 || 3:00

|-  style="background:#cfc;"
| 2017-01-28 || Win ||align=left|Candice Mitchell || WMC Women's Fight World Championship || Hua Hin, Thailand || Decision (Unanimous) || 5 || 3:00 
|-
! style=background:white colspan=9 |

|-  style="background:#fbb;"
| 2016-08-25 || Loss ||align=left|Ashley Nichols || Chokchai Stadium Opening Night || Phuket, Thailand || Decision (Unanimous) || 5 || 3:00 
|-
! style=background:white colspan=9 |

|-  style="background:#cfc;"
| 2014-02-15 || Win ||align=left|Candice Mitchell || Santai Festival || Chiang Mai, Thailand || Decision (Unanimous) || 3 || 3:00

|-  style="background:#cfc;"
| 2014-09-05 || Win ||align=left|Mangonkaw Ponlamaiplawgatt ||  || Bangkok, Thailand || Decision (Unanimous) || 3 || 3:00

|-  style="background:#fbb;"
| 2014-07-18 || Loss ||align=left|Gong Li Yue ||  || Bangkok, Thailand || Decision (Unanimous) || 3 || 3:00

|-  style="background:#cfc;"
| 2014-02-15 || Win ||align=left|Farida Okiko || King's Birthday Celebration || Bangkok, Thailand || Decision (Unanimous) || 5 || 2:00

|-  style="background:#cfc;"
| 2013-12-24 || Win ||align=left|Camila Pacheco ||  || Bangkok, Thailand || TKO || 3||

|-  style="background:#cfc;"
| 2013-04-12 || Win ||align=left|Theresa Carter || King's Birthday WPMF || Bangkok, Thailand || Decision  || 5 || 2:00 
|-
! style=background:white colspan=9 |

|-  style="background:#cfc;"
| 2013-02-05 || Win ||align=left| || Yod Muay Thai Nai Khanom Ton, Huamark Stadium || Bangkok, Thailand || Decision  || 5 || 2:00 
|-
! style=background:white colspan=9 |

|-  style="background:#fbb;"
| 2012-12-04 || Loss||align=left| Kate Houston|| King's Birthday || Bangkok, Thailand || Decision  || 5 || 2:00  
|-
! style=background:white colspan=9 |

|-  style="background:#cfc;"
| 2012-11-11 || Win ||align=left|AZUMA|| M-1 Muay Thai Challenge Sutt Yod Muaythai vol.4 Part1 || Tokyo, Japan || Decision (Unanimous) || 5 || 2:00 
|-
! style=background:white colspan=9 |

|-  style="background:#c5d2ea;"
| 2012-10-10 || Draw ||align=left|Iman Barlow || Muay Thai event in Thailand || Pattaya, Thailand || Decision || 3 || 3:00

|-  style="background:#fbb;"
| 2012-05-29 || Loss ||align=left|Zaza Sor Aree ||  || Saraburi, Thailand || Decision (Unanimous) || 3 || 3:00

|-  style="background:#cfc;"
| 2012-05-30 || Win ||align=left|Alexis Rufus || Rangsit Stadium || Bangkok, Thailand || Decision (Unanimous) || 5 || 3:00

|-  style="background:#cfc;"
| 2012-03-25 || Win ||align=left|AZUMA|| M-1 Muay Thai Challenge Sutt Yod Muaythai vol.1 Part1 || Tokyo, Japan || TKO (Doctor stopapge)|| 4 || 0:35 
|-
! style=background:white colspan=9 |

|-  style="text-align:center; background:#fbb;"
|  || Loss ||align=left|Chommanee Sor Taehiran ||  || Thailand || Decision|| 5 || 2:00 
|-
|-  style="text-align:center; background:#cfc;"
|  || Win||align=left|Chommanee Sor Taehiran ||  || Thailand || Decision|| 5 || 2:00 
|-
|-  style="text-align:center; background:#cfc;"
|  || Win||align=left|Chommanee Sor Taehiran ||  || Thailand || Decision|| 5 || 2:00 
|-
|-  style="text-align:center; background:#fbb;"
|  || Loss||align=left|Chommanee Sor Taehiran ||  || Thailand || Decision || 5 || 2:00 
|-
| colspan=9 | Legend:

Amateur Muaythai record 

|- style="background:#fbb;"
|2018-05-13
|Loss
| align="left" | Maria Klimova
|2018 IFMA World Championship
|Cancun, Mexico
|Decision (27-30)
|3
|3:00
|-
|- style="background:#cfc;"
|2017-09-19
|Win
| align="left" | Saeideh Ghaffari
|2017 Asian Indoor and Martial Arts Games, Final
|Ashgabat, Turkmenistan 
|Decision (30-27)
|3
|3:00
|-
|-
! style=background:white colspan=9 |
|- style="background:white"
|- style="background:#cfc;"
|2017-09-20
|Win
| align="left" | Chen Linling
|2017 Asian Indoor and Martial Arts Games, Semi Final
|Ashgabat, Turkmenistan
|Decision (30-27)
|3
|3:00
|-

|- style="background:#fbb;"
|2017-05-08
|Loss
| align="left" | Patricia Axling
|2017 IFMA World Muaythai Championships, Semi Final
|Minsk, Belarus
|Decision (29-28)
|3
|3:00
|-
|-
! style=background:white colspan=9 |

|- style="background:#cfc;"
|2017-05-07
|Win
| align="left" | Kristina Kuznecova 
|2017 IFMA World Muaythai Championships, Quarter Final
|Minsk, Belarus
|Decision (30-27)
|3
|3:00

|- style="background:#cfc;"
|2017-05-06
|Win
| align="left" | Anusha Pinto 
|2017 IFMA World Muaythai Championships, 1/8 Final
|Minsk, Belarus
|TKO
|1
|
|-
|- style="background:#cfc;"
|2016-09-26
|Win
| align="left" |  Phạm Thị Thu
|2016 Asian Beach Games, Final
|Da Nang, Vietnam
|Decision (30-27)
|3
|3:00
|-
|-
! style=background:white colspan=9 |
|- style="background:white"
|- style="background:#cfc;"
|2016-09-25
|Win
| align="left" | Ýaňyl Kawisowa  
|2016 Asian Beach Games, Semi Final
|Da Nang, Vietnam
|RSCO
|3
|3:00
|-
|- style="background:#cfc;"
|2016-05-23
|Win
| align="left" | Patricia Axling
|2016 IFMA World Muaythai Championships, Semi Final
|Jönköping, Sweden
|Decision (30-27)
|3
|3:00
|-
|-
! style=background:white colspan=9 |
|- style="background:white"
|- style="background:#cfc;"
|2013-07-02
|Win
| align="left" |  Phan Thị Ngọc Linh
|2013 Asian Indoor and Martial Arts Games, Final
|Incheon, South Korea
|Decision (5-0)
|3
|3:00
|-
|-
! style=background:white colspan=9 |
|- style="background:white"
|- style="background:#cfc;"
|2013-07-01
|Win
| align="left" | Kim Min-ji 
|2013 Asian Indoor and Martial Arts Games, Semi Final
|Incheon, South Korea
|RET
|3
|3:00
|-
|- style="background:#cfc;"
|2013-06-30
|Win
| align="left" | Myra Adin 
|2013 Asian Indoor and Martial Arts Games, Quarter Final
|Incheon, South Korea
|RSCO
|3
|3:00
|-
|-
|- style="background:#cfc;"
|2013-10-23
|Win
| align="left" | Natalia Dyachkova
|2013 World Combat Games, Final
|Saint Petersburg, Russia
|Decision (30-27)
|3
|3:00
|-
|-
! style=background:white colspan=9 |
|- style="background:white"
|- style="background:#cfc;"
|2013-10-21
|Win
| align="left" | Ashley Nichols
|2013 World Combat Games, Semi Final
|Saint Petersburg, Russia
|Decision (30-27)
|3
|3:00
|-
|- style="background:#cfc;"
|2013-10-19
|Win
| align="left" | Yang Yang
|2013 World Combat Games, Quarter Final
|Saint Petersburg, Russia
|Decision (30-27)
|3
|3:00
|-
|-
| colspan=9 | Legend:

Lethwei record 

|- style="background:#c5d2ea;"
| 2019-08-18 || Draw || align="left" | Vero Nika || Myanmar Lethwei World Championship 4 || Yangon, Myanmar || Draw || 4 || 3:00
|-
| colspan=9 | Legend:

See also 

 Muaythai at the 2017 Asian Indoor and Martial Arts Games
 Muaythai at the 2016 Asian Beach Games
 Muaythai at the 2013 Asian Indoor and Martial Arts Games
 Muay Thai at the 2013 World Combat Games

References

External links 

 Ratchadaphon Wihantamma at IFMA
 

1996 births
Living people
Ratchadaphon Wihantamma
Ratchadaphon Wihantamma
Ratchadaphon Wihantamma